Samuel Gubins (born 1942) is an American economist. He held leadership roles at the Academy of Natural Sciences in Philadelphia from 1981 to 1995 and the nonprofit academic publisher Annual Reviews from 1995 to 2015. He is an elected Fellow of the American Academy of Arts and Sciences and the American Association for the Advancement of Science.

Education
Samuel Gubins attended Reed College where he graduated with a B.A. in 1964. He graduated with a PhD from Johns Hopkins University in economics in 1970.

Career
From 1968–1981, he was assistant professor of economics at Haverford College. He was also vice president for finance at Haverford. He was senior vice president at the Academy of Natural Sciences in Philadelphia from 1981–1995. In 1995, Gubins became president and editor-in-chief of the nonprofit publishing company Annual Reviews, a position he held until 2015 when he was succeeded by Richard Gallagher. During his tenure at Annual Reviews, it added new journal titles in 20 subjects, going from 26 to 46 journals. He also oversaw the electronic publishing of the journals for the first time, starting with the Annual Review of Sociology and the Annual Review of Medicine. He remains on the board of Annual Reviews as of 2020. He has served on the board of directors of the Society for Industrial and Applied Mathematics since 1982.

Honors
In 2008, Gubins was elected a Fellow of both the American Academy of Arts and Sciences and the American Association for the Advancement of Science.

Personal life
His wife is Eleanor Bush Gubins, who was an assistant professor of economics and political science at Rosemont College.

References

1942 births
Living people

Reed College alumni
Johns Hopkins University alumni
Haverford College faculty
Fellows of the American Association for the Advancement of Science
Fellows of the American Academy of Arts and Sciences